The 1969–70 Cincinnati Royals season was one of the last years the franchise played in Cincinnati. In 1972, they moved to Kansas City. This was also the final season for Oscar Robertson, who went to the Milwaukee Bucks next season.

History
After his death in 1968, Louis Jacob's sons took over the ownership of the team. The first move of the young Jacobses was to hire in Kansas City sports manager Joe Axelson, a relative unknown in NBA circles who had befriended the ownership family. Axelson replaced the outgoing GM, Pepper Wilson, who had served with the franchise since it arrived in Cincinnati in 1957. The three then were able to draw in former Boston College coach and Boston Celtics legend Bob Cousy for the then-very high salary of $100,000 per season to replace Cincinnati favorite Ed Jucker as coach. Cousy arrived to considerable press to his new team.

Cousy wanted a young running team and began shipping out veterans who did not follow his new program. Jerry Lucas, a three-time First Team All-Pro with Cincinnati, was traded to the San Francisco Warriors in exchange for guard Jim King and forward Bill Turner. King and Turner combined to average ten points per game that season, then left the following season. Turner in fact joined Lucas in San Francisco. Lucas played four more NBA seasons and was a San Francisco NBA All-Star in 1971.

Cousy also sent long-time Cincinnati favorite Adrian Smith to San Francisco. Cousy attempted to trade Oscar Robertson to the Baltimore Bullets for Gus Johnson. Robertson exercised his right to veto the trade.
The team was known as "the Running Royals". Cincinnati topped the 110-point mark in each of the campaign's final 21 contests, and during a six-game span in mid-February, the team averaged 127 points.

Cousy spoke often of a youth movement for the team that year, but ended up starting 36-year-old Johnny Green, 33-year-old Connie Dierking and 30-year-old Oscar Robertson. Tom Van Arsdale joined Robertson as NBA All-Stars. He then took the ball out of the hands of Robertson, the NBA's all-time point guard, and gave it to rookie Norm Van Lier, who did turn in an impressive season.

Adding still more to the story was Bob Cousy's decision to play at age 41. In order to be activated, the Royals had to trade solid reserve Bill Dinwiddie to the Boston Celtics so that Red Auerbach could release him from the Boston retired list. Cousy played seven games in November, and played poorly, having not played in the NBA for five seasons. Despite the hype and changes, the team was clearly worse than it had been the previous season. But the Jacobses and Axelson were already looking to sell the team anyway. This season marked the beginning of the end of the Cincinnati Royals as a result. The Royals failed to qualify for the playoffs. The Royals finished in 5th place with a 36–46 record.

Following the season, Robertson was traded to the Milwaukee Bucks for Flynn Robinson and Charlie Paulk. In 10 seasons with the Royals, Robertson averaged 29.3 points, 10.3 assists, and 8.5 rebounds per game.

Roster

Draft picks
The Royals first round pick was star guard Herm Gilliam of Purdue. Gilliam was lost for much of the 1969–70 season with mandatory military service. The following year, he was selected by Buffalo in the expansion draft.

Second pick Luther Rackley had starred locally at Xavier as a solid 6'10 big man. He played one year for the Royals and then was selected by Cleveland in the expansion draft.
Slender 6'7 Luther Green was the third Royals pick. He found better chances with the ABA's New York Nets and signed there.

Regular season

Season standings

Record vs. opponents

Season Schedule

October 2–6 including a road win at Boston, November 8–7, December 9–8, the team finished December at a decent 19–21. January 7–10, including four-straight. February 5–8 and March 5–7 with the team tiring down the stretch. The team missed the playoffs by six games.

Awards and records
 Oscar Robertson, All-NBA Second Team

References

 Royals on Basketball Reference

Sacramento Kings seasons
Cincinnati
Cincinnati
Cincinnati